Juanita M. Christensen (formerly Harris) is an American government official and electronics engineer. She is the deputy chief of staff for logistics (G4) of facilities and environmental at the United States Army Materiel Command. From November 2017 until January 2021, Christensen was director of the United States Army Aviation and Missile Center, during which time (in February 2105) she became the first African-American woman from Redstone Arsenal to join the Senior Executive Service.

Early life and education 
Christensen was born to Clottele M. Denzmore. She was raised in East St. Louis, Illinois and excelled in math and science in high school. Christensen decided to pursue a degree in engineering, enrolling at the University of Illinois Urbana-Champaign. She faced racism as a black female in an engineering program, with one professor stating that he did not understand why she was in his class. She completed a Bachelor of Science degree in Computer Engineering from the University of Illinois in 1985. She was the first of her seven siblings to complete college.

Christensen earned a Master of Science degree in Computer Resources and Information Systems Management from Webster University in 1994. In February 2011, she completed a Doctor of Management in Organizational Leadership at the University of Phoenix School of Advanced Studies. Her dissertation was titled A Mentorship Study of Women in the Department of Defense Acquisition Sector. Shelia A. Vinson served as Christensen' doctoral mentor.

Career 
Christensen began her career as an electronics engineer working at Boeing (in St. Louis, MO) in May 1985.  She then changed jobs and moved several times over the next 36 years serving in various roles:  

Christensen completed a corporate leadership development course with Veridan at the Bolger Center in 2003. She completed training in the Defense Acquisition University executive leadership program in 2013.

Awards, recognition & certifications 
In December 2011, Christensen was named a STEM Science Spectrum Trailblazer by the Black Engineer of the Year Award (BEYA) program. She received a BEYA alumni leadership award in May 2012.  Christensen is certified by the Defense Acquisition Workforce Improvement Act, Level III, Systems Engineering Acquisition, and the Defense Acquisition Workforce Improvement Act, Level I, Program Management.

Christensen was selected for Senior Executive Service (SES) in February 2015.

Personal life 
Christensen was married twice. Her first marriage was to Dwight Harris. She has two sons and a daughter.  Christensen married a second time to David Christensen.

References

Citations

Bibliography 

Living people
Year of birth missing (living people)
People from East St. Louis, Illinois
21st-century African-American women
African-American women engineers
African-American engineers
American women engineers
Computer engineers
American electronics engineers
21st-century American engineers
21st-century American women scientists
21st-century African-American scientists
United States Army women civilians
University of Illinois Urbana-Champaign alumni
Webster University alumni
University of Phoenix alumni
Engineers from Illinois